This article contains the honours, records and statistics of Middlesbrough Football Club. This article lists all of the major honours won by Middlesbrough since their foundation. This list also lists the major playing honours including top goalscorer and most appearances. The Club records including record transfer fees are shown below as are international player honours.

Middlesbrough are an English professional association football club based in Middlesbrough, in the Tees Valley, who currently play in the EFL Championship. The club was founded in 1876 and have played at their current home ground, the Riverside Stadium, since 1995. Middlesbrough were founding members of the Premier League in 1992. They have won one major trophy in their history: the 2004 Football League Cup.

Honours

Domestic

League
Football League Second Division / Football League Division One
Champions 1926–27, 1928–29, 1973–74, 1994–95; runners up 1901–02, 1991–92, 1997–98, 2015–16
Football League Third Division
Runners up 1966–67, 1986–87
Northern League
Champions 1893–94, 1894–95, 1896–97; runners up 1890–91, 1891–92, 1897–98

Cup
League Cup
Winners 2003–04; runners up 1996–97, 1997–98
FA Cup
Runners up 1996–97
FA Amateur Cup
Winners 1894–95, 1897–98
Zenith Data Systems Cup
Runners up 1990

International
UEFA Cup
Runners up 2005–06
Anglo-Scottish Cup
Winners 1975
Kirin Cup
Winners 1980

Player records

Appearances

 Youngest first-team player – 16 years and 72 days
 Nathan Wood (vs Notts County 14 August 2018)
 Oldest first-team player – 40 years and 68 days
 Dimitrios Konstantopoulos (vs Newport County 5 February 2019)
 Most consecutive appearances – 305
 David Armstrong, between March 1973 and August 1980
 Most appearances
 As of 22 May 2008. Competitive matches only, appearances as substitutes in brackets.
{| class="wikitable sortable" style="text-align: center;"
!width=5%|#
!width=20%|Name
!width=12%|Years
!width=12%|League
!width=12%|FA Cup
!width=14%|League Cup
!width=12%|Other
!width=13%|Total
|-
|1||style="text-align:left;"| ||1902–1923||563 (0)||39 (0)||0 (0)||0 (0)||602 (0)
|-
|2||style="text-align:left;"| 
||1960–1973||457 (5)||40 (0)||26 (0)||4 (0)||527 (5)
|-
|3||style="text-align:left;"| 
||1966–1977||395 (20)||37 (0)||26 (4)||15 (2)||473 (26)
|-
|4||style="text-align:left;"| 
||1971–1982||409 ||33 ||31 ||15 ||488
|-
|5||style="text-align:left;"| 
||1971–1983||401 ||34 ||33 ||13 ||481
|-
|6||style="text-align:left;"| 
||1925–1939||418 ||35 ||0 (0)||0 (0)||453
|-
|7||style="text-align:left;"| 
||1910–1930||421 ||28 ||0 (0)||0 (0)||449
|-
|8||style="text-align:left;"| 
||1997–2008||367 ||32 ||26 ||21 ||446
|-
|9||style="text-align:left;"| 
||1971–1981||359 ||29 ||28 ||15 ||431
|-
|10=||style="text-align:left;"| 
||1982–1992||348 ||23 ||29 ||24 ||424
|-
|10=||style="text-align:left;"| 
||1983–1995||339 ||25 ||32 ||28 ||424
|}

Goalscorers
 Most goals in a season – 63
 George Camsell (Second Division, 1926–1927)
 Most League goals in a season – 59
 George Camsell (Second Division, 1926–1927)
 Most goals in a single match – 5
 John Wilkie, vs Gainsborough Trinity, 2 March 1901
 Andy Wilson, vs Nottingham Forest, 6 October 1923
 James McClelland, vs Leeds United, 9 January 1926
 George Camsell, vs Manchester City, 25 December 1926
 George Camsell, vs Aston Villa, 9 September 1935
 Brian Clough, vs Brighton and Hove Albion, 23 August 1958
 Most goals in the League – 325
 George Camsell, 1925–1939
 Most goals in the FA Cup – 20
 George Camsell, 1925–1939
 Most goals in the League Cup – 13
 John Hickton, 1966–1978
 Most goals in European competition – 8
 Mark Viduka, 2004–2007
 Oldest goalscorer – 38 years and 2 months
 Bryan Robson, vs Port Vale, 26 March 1995
 Youngest goalscorer – 17 years and 64 days
 Arthur Horsfield, vs Grimsby Town, 17 April 1963
 Youngest hat-trick scorer – 20 years and 6 days
 Tony McAndrew, vs Sheffield United, 17 April 1976
 Top goalscorers
 As of 29 January 2008. Competitive matches only, appearances including substitutes appear in brackets.
{| class="wikitable sortable" style="text-align: center;"
!width=5%|#
!width=20%|Name
!width=12%|Years
!width=12%|League
!width=12%|FA Cup
!width=14%|League Cup
!width=12%|Other
!width=13%|Total
|-
|1||style="text-align:left;"| 
||1925–1939||325 (418)||20 (35)||0 (0)||0 (0)||345 (453)
|-
|2||style="text-align:left;"| 
||1909–1925||203 (344)||10 (21)||0 (0) ||0 (0)||213 (365)
|-
|3||style="text-align:left;"| 
||1955–1961||197 (213)||5 (8)||2 (1) ||0 (0)||204 (222)
|-
|4||style="text-align:left;"| 
||1966–1977||159 (415)||13 (37)||13 (30) ||7 (17)||192 (499)
|-
|5||style="text-align:left;"| 
||1932–1950||147 (240)||15 (29)||0 (0) ||0 (0)||162 (269)
|-
|6||style="text-align:left;"| 
||1985–1992||118 (307)||4 (19)||10 (28) ||14 (27)||146 (381)
|-
|7||style="text-align:left;"| 
||1955–1964||125 (218)||8 (13)||8 (7) ||0 (0)||141 (238)
|-
|8||style="text-align:left;"| 
||1969–1985||90 (328)||10 (29)||8 (24) ||3 (17)||111 (398)
|-
|9||style="text-align:left;"| 
||1936–1954||99 (341)||11 (27)||0 (0) ||0 (0)||110 (368)
|-
|10||style="text-align:left;"| 
||1926–1933||99 (221)||3 (17)||0 (0) ||0 (0)||102 (238)
|}

International
Statistics relate to international caps gained while at the club.
 Most capped player
 Mark Schwarzer – 51 for Australia
 Most capped player for England
 Wilf Mannion – 26

Highest transfer fees
As not all transfer details are made public, undisclosed transfer fees are not included in the tables, however reported media estimates of notable fees are included below to give a general idea. Fees are listed as the highest total that the fee could rise to.

Paid
Updated 4 November 2019.

Received
Updated 4 November 2019.

Undisclosed fees
The following are media estimates of notable undisclosed fees. The official fees remain unknown.

Club records

Wins
Record League win – 9–0
vs Brighton & Hove Albion, Second Division, 23 August 1958
Record FA Cup win – 11–0
vs Scarborough, 4 October 1890
Record League Cup win – 7–0
vs Hereford United, 18 September 1996
Record European win – 4–1
vs FC Basel, UEFA Cup, 6 April 2006
Record Away Win'' - 7-1
vs Blackburn Rovers, 29 November 1947 and Derby County, 29 August 1959Most League wins in a season – 28
in the Third Division, 1986-87Fewest League wins in a season – 5
in the Premier League, 2016-17

DefeatsRecord League defeat – 0–9
vs Blackburn Rovers, Second Division, 6 November 1954Record FA Cup defeat – 1–8
vs Hebburn Argyle, 12 December 1896Record League Cup defeat – 0–4
vs Manchester City, 21 January 1976Record European defeat – 0–4
vs Sevilla, UEFA Cup, 10 May 2006 (Match Details)Record Home Defeat - Five goal margin 1-6
vs Arsenal, 24 April 1999
and 0-5
vs Bury, 12 February 1910; Huddersfield Town, 25 August 1962; Chelsea, 18 October 2008; West Bromwich Albion, 19 September 2009Most League defeats in a season – 27
in the First Division, 1923-24Fewest League defeats in a season – 4
in the Second Division, 1973-74

GoalsMost League goals scored in one season – 122
in 42 matches, Second Division, 1926-1927Fewest League goals scored in one season – 28
in 38 matches, Premier League, 2008-2009Most League goals conceded in one season – 91
in 42 matches, First Division, 1953-1954Fewest League goals conceded in one season – 24
in 34 matches, Second Division, 1901-1902

PointsMost points earned in a season (3 for a win) – 94
in 46 matches, Third Division, 1986-1987Fewest points earned in a season (3 for a win) – 28
in 38 matches, Premier League, 2016-2017Most points earned in a season (2 for a win) – 65
in 42 matches, Second Division, 1973-1974Fewest points earned in a season (2 for a win) – 22
in 42 matches, First Division, 1923-1924

SequencesLongest sequence of League wins – 9
in the Second Division, 1973–74Longest sequence without a League win – 19
in the First Division, 1981–82Longest sequence of League defeats – 8
in the Second Division, 1954–55
in the Premier League, 1995–96Longest sequence of away League defeats – 12
in the Premier League, 2008–09Longest sequence of unbeaten League matches – 24
in the Second Division, 1973–74Longest sequence of draws – 8
in the Second Division, 1970–71Longest sequence of League Cleansheets – 9
in the Football League Championship, 2015–16

Attendances
 Highest attendance at the Riverside Stadium – 34,836
vs Norwich City, Premier League, 28 December 2004)
 Lowest attendance at the Riverside – 3,918
vs Northampton Town, League Cup, 11 September 2001
 Highest attendance at Ayresome Park – 53,802
vs Newcastle United, First Division, 27 December 1949
 Lowest attendance at Ayresome Park''' – 1,633
vs Brescia Calcio, Anglo-Italian Cup, 22 December 1993

Notes

References

Records
English football club statistics